Abrepo is a suburb of Kumasi in the Ashanti Region of Ghana. It is also the location for Kumasi Girls Senior High School and Islamic Senior High School, Kumasi.

Populated places in the Ashanti Region